Big Brother 5 is the fifth season of the Polish reality television series Big Brother. The show followed a number of contestants, known as housemates, who are isolated from the outside world for an extended period of time in a custom-built house. Each week, one of the housemates is evicted by a public vote, with the last housemate remaining winning a cash prize.

The Big Brother 5 was divided into two parts: the first part is the one with celebrity (VIP) housemates and the second part is the one with civilian housemates. The show part one kicked off on 2 March 2008, where nine celebrity housemates entered the house. On 30 March 2008, two potential housemates for the civilian edition of Big Brother 5 entered the house, marked as the second part kicked off. The celebrity edition is still taking place in the house and the launch of the civilian edition marks the first time in the world of Big Brother history that a country has two editions running at the same time.

The first part lasted 36 days, the final was on 6 April 2008, Jarosław "Jarek" Jakimowicz walked out as the winner. The prize for him is two watches with a total value of 50,000 PLN. The second part lasted 64 days, on 1 June 2008, the final of the second part and the Big Brother 5, Janusz Strączek declared as the winner of the second part. The prize for him is 50,000 PLN and a Motorcycle - David Harley. The whole Big Brother 5 lasted 92 days in total.

Kuba Klawiter hosts the main show Big Brother - Ring with Małgorzata Kosik. Sideshows include Big Brother – Prosto z Domu Monday to Friday 18:00, a 30-minute live stream, viewers will be able to watch live how housemates deal with the special tasks set by Big Brother. Big Brother - Extra, a show for adult viewers: new, not broadcast in the live stream show at 18:30 or in recaps shows, reports from the Big Brother House. Big Brother – Omnibus, a summary of the past week on Sundays at 18:00.

Part 1: VIP 
Nine celebrity housemates entered the house on Day 1, March 2, 2008. And on Day 8, March 9, 2008, two celebrity housemates entered the house.

Housemates

Nominations Table

Notes

Part 2: civilian 
The civilian part started on Day 29, March 30, 2008, when two male potential housemates: Janusz and Krystian entered the secret room inside the house. The four remaining VIP housemates will choose one of them became the official housemate. On April 1, Janusz became the first official housemate, after Krystian after received all 4 evict votes. Later that day, two female potential housemates: Dorota and Monika entered the house. The four remaining VIP housemates and Janusz will choose one of them became the official housemate. On April 3, Monika became the second official housemate, for received four save votes. Dorota was evicted for only received one save vote.

Housemates

Nominations Table

Notes

References

External links 
 Official site

05
2008 Polish television seasons